Rhinecanthus abyssus is a species of triggerfish found in the West Pacific Ocean, where known from Sulawesi in Indonesian and around the Ryukyu Islands of Japan. It is the most recently described of 7 species in the genus Rhinecanthus.

Behavior 
Little is known about the behavior of this species presently.

References

Taxa named by Keiichi Matsuura
Fish described in 1989
Balistidae